Chhang Dawa Sherpa (aka Dawa Sherpa) (: (born July 30, 1982) is a Nepalese mountaineer and the youngest mountaineer till 2019 to summit the 14 highest peaks. Dawa and his brother Mingma Sherpa together hold the world record as "first brothers to summit the 14 highest peaks", a single record shared by the two.

Early life
Chhang Dawa Sherpa was born and grew up in the rural village of Narbuchaur in Makalu Village of Sankhuwasabha District in Nepal.

Dawa as his first 8000ers, first reached the summit of Makalu (8485 m) in the Spring of 2001 without supplementary oxygen along with his brother Mingma Sherpa. He and his brother Mingma Sherpa attained the Guinness world record of "World's First Two Brothers" to successfully summit the fourteen mountains of the world which are over 8000 meters in height. Sherpa brothers used supplementary oxygen only on four highest 8000ers among all fourteen. They now operate the expedition company named Seven Summits Treks, which organize climbs and treks throughout Nepal, Pakistan and China.

First Ascent
28 April in 2010, Chhang Dawa Sherpa along with Carlos Soria Fontán, Tente Lagunilla and Sherpa's team made the first ascent of Mt. Dome Khang (7,260m).

Mountains summited

Leading in 8000ers
K2 Expedition: Chhang Dawa has been leading expedition in the Karakorum including K2 since 2012-current.
K2 Winter 2020/2021: 2 Nepali teams led by Nirmal Puja and Mingma "G" Gelje managed to climb K2 in winter for the first time. One member of Chhang Dawa's team was among the 10 Nepalease climbers together at the top. Chhang Dawa himself stayed in base camp.

Pole Explore

See also
 List of Mount Everest summiteers by number of times to the summit

References

Living people
1982 births
Sherpa summiters of Mount Everest
People from Sankhuwasabha District
Nepalese summiters of Mount Everest
Summiters of all 14 eight-thousanders